CBOT-DT (channel 4) is a CBC Television station in Ottawa, Ontario, Canada. It is part of a twinstick with Ici Radio-Canada Télé station CBOFT-DT (channel 9). Both stations share studios at the CBC Ottawa Production Centre on Queen Street (across from the Confederation Line light rail station) in Downtown Ottawa, alongside the main corporate offices of the CBC; CBOT-DT's transmitter is located on the Ryan Tower at Camp Fortune in Chelsea, Quebec, north of Gatineau.

History

CBOT went on the air for the first time on June 2, 1953, becoming the third television station in Canada. Before the launch of Télévision de Radio-Canada station CBOFT, CBOT aired both English and French-language programs.

During the late 1970s into the early 1980s, CBOT was known as "CBC 4 Ottawa", and its newscasts were known as CBC 4 News. In 1980, CBOT's 6 p.m. newscast was anchored by Ab Douglas, and by Joe Spence at 11:27, following The National. During the mid-1980s, the station was known as "CBOT 4", now "CBC Ottawa".

News operation

CBOT-DT presently broadcasts 10 hours, 40 minutes of locally produced newscasts each week (with two hours each weekday, a half-hour on Saturdays and ten minutes on Sundays). CBOT airs local news programming in the form of a 90-minute newscast from 5 to 6:30 p.m. and a half-hour newscast at 11 p.m. on weekdays. On weekends, the station airs a half-hour 6 p.m. newscast on Saturdays and a ten-minute summary airs on Sundays at 11 p.m.

Notable current on–air staff

Notable former on–air staff
 Ian Black (CMOS-endorsed weathercaster) – meteorologist
 Rita Celli – former CBC News: Ottawa at Six anchor
 Lloyd Robertson (later anchor of CBC News: The National and the CTV National News; now retired)

Technical information

Subchannel

Analogue-to-digital conversion
On August 31, 2011, when Canadian television stations in CRTC-designated mandatory markets transitioned from analogue to digital broadcasts, the station's digital signal remained on UHF channel 25. However, through the use of PSIP, digital television receivers display CBOT-DT's virtual channel as 4.1.

Transmitters
CBOT operated six analog television rebroadcasters in Eastern Ontario and included communities such as Pembroke. Due to federal funding reductions to the CBC, in April 2012, the CBC responded with substantial budget cuts, which included shutting down CBC's and Radio-Canada's remaining analog transmitters on July 31, 2012. None of CBC's or Radio-Canada's television rebroadcasters were converted to digital.

Former rebroadcasters of CBOT

References

External links
CBC Ottawa
 

BOT-DT
Television channels and stations established in 1953
BOT-DT
1953 establishments in Ontario